United Nations Security Council Resolution 813, adopted unanimously on 26 March 1993, after reaffirming Resolution 788 (1992) and determining that the situation in Liberia constituted a threat to international peace and security, the Council condemned the failure of the parties in the country – the Armed Forces of Liberia, ULIMO, National Patriotic Front of Liberia and Independent National Patriotic Front of Liberia among others, to implement the Yamoussoukro IV Accord.

The Council welcomed the report of the Secretary-General Boutros Boutros-Ghali and his appointment of Trevor Gordon-Somers as Special Representative for Liberia, and commended the efforts of the Organisation of African Unity and Economic Community of West African States (ECOWAS) to help restore stability in Liberia, reaffirming the belief that the Yamoussoukro IV Accord offers the best possible framework for a peaceful resolution of the Liberian civil war. It also condemned attacks on the peacekeeping forces and the violation of the ceasefire, calling on all parties to implement the Accord.

The resolution called upon all Member States to abide by the arms embargo on the country imposed under Chapter VII of the United Nations Charter, demanding that all parties co-operate with United Nations and ECOWAS personnel, proposing to consider against parties that are unwilling to co-operate. It also commended the efforts of Member States and international organisations for their humanitarian efforts in Liberia.

Resolution 813 concluded by requesting the Secretary-General to:

(a) consider the possibility of convening a meeting of the President of the Interim Government of National Unity and the warring factions;
(b) discuss with ECOWAS and the parties concerned the contribution which the United Nations could make in support of the implementation of the Yamoussoukro IV Accord and possible deployment of observers;
(c) report back to the Security Council on the implementation of the current resolution as soon as possible.

See also
 Charles Taylor
 First Liberian Civil War
 List of United Nations Security Council Resolutions 801 to 900 (1993–1994)

References

External links
 
Text of the Resolution at undocs.org

 0813
20th century in Liberia
 0813
March 1993 events